Moneyboys  is a 2021 Taiwanese-Austrian drama film written and directed by C.B.Yi (as his first feature film), and starring Kai Ko, Chloe Maayan, J.C. Lin, Bai Yufan and Sun Qiheng. In June 2021, the film was selected to compete in the Un Certain Regard section at the 2021 Cannes Film Festival. The film had been a theatrical release in Taiwan on November 19, 2021 distributed by Cola Film. It is now streaming on Mubi and available on Amazon Prime Video.

Synopsis
Fei works illegally as a hustler in order to support his family, yet when he realizes they are willing to accept his money but not his way of life, there is a major breakdown in their relations. Through his relationship to the headstrong Long, Fei seems able to find a new lease on life, but then he encounters Xiaolai, the love of his youth, who confronts him with the guilt of his repressed past.

Cast
Kai Ko as  Liang Fei
Chloe Maayan as Lulu, Liang Hong/ Li Yu
 Bai Yufan as Liang Long
 JC Lin as Han Xiaolai
Sun Qiheng as Chen Wei
 Zach Lu as Xiangdong
 Daphne Low as Alian
Chen Mu as Guo Yong
 Brando Huang as Client Zhang
 Lin I-hsiung as Fei's grandfather

Awards and nominations

References

External links
 
 

2021 drama films
2021 films
2021 LGBT-related films
Austrian drama films
Austrian LGBT-related films
Mandarin-language films
Taiwanese drama films
Taiwanese LGBT-related films
LGBT-related drama films
Films about male prostitution